Prosenina is a genus of parasitic flies in the family Tachinidae. There are at least two described species in Prosenina.

Species
Prosenina nicholsoni Malloch, 1930
Prosenina sandemani Barraclough, 1992

References

Dexiinae
Diptera of Australasia
Taxa named by John Russell Malloch
Tachinidae genera